Pisgah High School may refer to:
 Pisgah High School (Mississippi)
 Pisgah High School (North Carolina)